Wild Is the Wind is the sixth studio album by American singer and pianist Nina Simone released by Philips Records in 1966. The album was compiled from several recordings that were left over from sessions (in 1964 and 1965) for previous Philips albums.

In 2020, the album was ranked 212 on Rolling Stone's 500 Greatest Albums of All Time.

Response
The album was a Billboard magazine "special merit pick" on release, with the reviewer commenting: "Simone ... sets up an exceptional romantic mood that offers top listening delight".

The song "Four Women" was released as a single, and gained attention when banned by the New York jazz focused radio station WLIB due to concern over the lyrics.

Simone first recorded "Black Is the Color of My True Love's Hair" in 1955, in Philadelphia with a strings arrangement and was not intended for release at the time. (In 1970 that version appeared on the album Gifted & Black.) In April 1964 she went into a New York Studio with her band, and on the second day in the studio, she recorded the version of "Black Is the Color of My True Love’s Hair" that would appear on Wild Is The Wind. For the song, Simone only wanted a minimal accompaniment with her playing the piano and a bass drone. Lisle Atkinson describes what he was asked to do during his time in Nina Simone’s band: “She wanted the least amount of complication as possible—roots and 5’s, nothing too slick. I have to give Nina credit for being aware that I could bow, and she utilized it a lot. She had me playing a lot of arco in performances.”

"Wild Is The Wind" was covered by David Bowie on his 1976 album Station to Station.

"Lilac Wine" was covered by Jeff Buckley on his album Grace (1994).

The album was included in Robert Dimery's 1001 Albums You Must Hear Before You Die. The album was also rated the 5th best album of the 1960s by Pitchfork.

Track listing

Charts

References

External links

Wild Is the Wind (Adobe Flash) at Radio3Net (streamed copy where licensed)

1966 albums
Nina Simone albums
Albums arranged by Horace Ott
Albums produced by Hal Mooney
Philips Records albums